Ovulatibuccinum is a genus of sea snails, marine gastropod mollusks in the subfamily Buccininae of the family Buccinidae, the true whelks.

Species
Species within the genus Ovulatibuccinum include:
 Ovulatibuccinum fimbriatum (Golikov & Sirenko, 1988)
 Ovulatibuccinum ovulum (Dall, 1895)
 Ovulatibuccinum perlatum Fraussen & Chino, 2009
Species brought into synonymy
 Ovulatibuccinum bombycinum (Dall, 1907): synonym of Buccinum bombycinum Dall, 1907
 Ovulatibuccinum clarki (Kantor & Harasewych, 1998): synonym of Buccinum clarki (Kantor & Harasewych, 1998)

References

 Golikov A.N. & Sirenko B.I. (1988). New data on the systematics of the subfamily Buccininae (Gastropoda, Pectinibranchia, Bucciniformes)

Buccinidae